Mamie Creek may refer to:

Mamie Creek (South Fork Flathead River tributary), a stream in Iowa
Mamie Creek (Iowa), a stream in Montana